Woolsey may refer to:

In places:
 Woolsey, Georgia, USA, a town
 Woolsey Flat, California, USA, a former settlement
 Woolsey Hall,  the primary auditorium at Yale University in New Haven, Connecticut.

In people:
 Bill Woolsey, (1934–2022), American competition swimmer and Olympic champion
 Calvin Woolsey, American physician and pianist
 Gamel Woolsey, American author and poet
 John M. Woolsey, American judge
 Kit Woolsey, bridge expert
 Lynn Woolsey, American politician
 Melancthon Taylor Woolsey, United States Naval officer
 R. James Woolsey, former Director of the CIA under the Bill Clinton administration
 Robert Woolsey, American film comedian
 Sarah Chauncey Woolsey, American children's author
 Ted Woolsey, American video game translator
 Theodore Dwight Woolsey, past president of Yale University
 Theodore Salisbury Woolsey, American legal scholar and son of the above
 Theodore Salisbury Woolsey, Jr., son of Theodore Salisbury Woolsey, grandson of Theodore Dwight Woolsey
 Thomas Wolsey circa 1470-1530), English statesman and clergyman

In fictional characters:
 Richard Woolsey, a character in Stargate SG-1 and Stargate Atlantis

In other uses:
 USS Woolsey, two ships in the United States Navy
 Woolsey (convention), a Bridge convention
The Woolsey Fire, a 2018 wildfire in southern California

See also
Wolsey (disambiguation)
Wolseley (disambiguation)